The year 665 BC was a year of the pre-Julian Roman calendar. In the Roman Empire, it was known as year 89 Ab urbe condita. The denomination 665 BC for this year has been used since the early medieval period, when the Anno Domini calendar era became the prevalent method in Europe for naming years.

Events

Births
 Phraortes, king of the Median Empire (approximate date)
 Xiqi, Chinese ruler of the State of Jin (died 651 BC)

Deaths

References

 
660s BC